Eloise May Jones (née Shaver; September 7, 1917 – March 8, 2004) was a Canadian politician who represented the electoral district of Saskatoon in the House of Commons of Canada from 1964 to 1965.

She won the seat in a by-election on June 22, 1964, following the death of Henry Jones, her husband and the district's incumbent Member of Parliament. She defeated Liberal candidate Sidney Buckwold, a mayor of Saskatoon who had also lost to Henry Jones in the 1963 election. She sat as a member of the Progressive Conservative caucus.

Jones did not stand for reelection in the 1965 election, returning instead to her work as a psychiatrist.

External links

1917 births
2004 deaths
Members of the House of Commons of Canada from Saskatchewan
Progressive Conservative Party of Canada MPs
People from the United Counties of Stormont, Dundas and Glengarry
Politicians from Saskatoon
Canadian psychiatrists
Women members of the House of Commons of Canada
Women in Saskatchewan politics
20th-century Canadian women politicians
Canadian women psychiatrists